John Dolan (born 19 May 1956) is an Irish former Independent politician who served as a Senator for the Administrative Panel from April 2016 to March 2020. He is the CEO of the Disability Federation of Ireland.

He holds a BA in Economics and English from University College Dublin, a qualifications in Philosophy from St. Patrick's College, Thurles and Personal Management from the National College of Industrial Relations.

He lost his seat at the 2020 Seanad election.

References

1956 births
Living people
Members of the 25th Seanad
Irish disability rights activists
Independent members of Seanad Éireann
Alumni of University College Dublin
Alumni of the National College of Ireland
Alumni of St. Patrick's College, Thurles